Tai Sing Ng is a Malaysian politician from PKR. He was the Member of Perak State Legislative Assembly for Kuala Sepetang from 2008 to 2013.

Election result

References 

People's Justice Party (Malaysia) politicians
Members of the Perak State Legislative Assembly
Malaysian people of Chinese descent
Malaysian politicians of Chinese descent
Living people
Year of birth missing (living people)